Follow Alana is a travel television show hosted by Alana Nichols, and produced by Aurora Digital Media.

History 
Debuting in 2017, the show tracks Alana - born profoundly deaf and effectively communicates with the assistance of a cochlear implant and Auditory-Verbal Therapy, on her worldwide travel adventures. In the show, Alana introduces diverse sceneries, lifestyles, cultures, and cuisines of various destinations, encouraging the audience to build a loving and sustainable relationship with the environment. The show also features celebrity personalities such as Roger Federer. The show has been broadcast on television in Taiwan, and can also be found on various platforms online including 'mini-episodes' on YouTube.

The show has won Remi Winner of 2018 Worldfest-Houston International Film Festival and was nominated by 2018 New York Festivals International Television & Film Awards.

Beginning March 19, 2021, the show became available on both Apple TV and Google Play in North America. It is also available on numerous other online platforms and broadcast television channels throughout Asia, including China, Taiwan, and Singapore. Prior to its US debut, Fodor's travel guide named Alana, "the definition of #travelinspiration" and described the show as, "the most wholesome travel show you didn't know you needed."

Follow Alana has won a number of television awards, including the 2020 Bronze and Silver Remi Awards at the Worldfest-Houston International Film Festival and was also a finalist at the New York International Television & Film Festival Awards in 2018.

Episodes 
All seasons below are for the Taiwan version. Season 6 was released in the US as Season 1, under the name "Follow Alana : Switzerland." Season 5 was released in the US as Season 2, under the name "Follow Alana: Australia."

Season 1

Season 2

Season 3

Season 4

Season 5 (aka Follow Alana: Australia, Season 2 in the USA)

Season 6 (aka Follow Alana: Switzerland, Season 1 in the USA)

Availability 

 USA - Apple TV, Google Play and on demand from streaming video provider Choco TV. 
 Switzerland - AppleTV, Google Play, Tubi, Plex, Crackle, LocalNow, Glewed
 Australia - AppleTV, GooglePlay 
 Limited episodes are also available on both Eva Air and China Airlines. 

Previously, the show was broadcast on TVBS and CITI in Taiwan.

Awards

External links 

 Official Website
 Follow Alana on Youtube
 Follow Alana on Apple TV

References 

2017 Taiwanese television series debuts
2010s travel television series
TVBS original programming
Chung T'ien Television original programming